Sam Smith  is a contemporary Australian filmmaker and artist, based in the UK. He is the co-director of contemporary art space Obsidian Coast, with Nella Aarne.

Education
Smith graduated from the MFA in Fine Art course at Goldsmiths, University of London in 2015. He completed a BFA with Honours at the College of Fine Arts, Sydney in 2003.

Career
Smith's films, video installations and live desktop performances have been presented at many international art institutions and film festivals, including International Film Festival Rotterdam, Whitechapel Gallery and Institute of Contemporary Arts, Les Rencontres Internationales (Paris and Berlin), Australian Centre for the Moving Image (Melbourne), KW Institute for Contemporary Art (Berlin), the Art Gallery of NSW in Sydney, and many others.

Smith is the co-director of Obsidian Coast, with Nella Aarne. Obsidian Coast is a contemporary art gallery that hosts exhibitions, residencies, events and a library project.

He lives and works in Bradford-on-Avon, England.

Recognition and awards 
Smith has undertaken a number of residencies. He was part of the International Studio Programme for one year at Künstlerhaus Bethanien in Berlin. Previous residencies include Helsinki International Artist Programme; Artspace, Sydney; and Youkobo Art Space in Tokyo, Japan. He was awarded New Work grants in 2007 and 2010 from the Australia Council for the Arts. Other grants and awards include:
2007: Helen Lempriere Travelling Art Scholarship to undertake a series of artist mentorships in New York City and Berlin
2008: Winner, inaugural 2008 Wilson HTM National Art Prize
2008: Winner, Churchie national emerging art prize
2008: Finalist, inaugural Premier of Queensland's National New Media Art Award
2012: Australia Council Visual Arts Board Skills and Arts Development grant
2014: Goldsmiths International Postgraduate Scholarship
2014: Ian Potter Cultural Trust grant

Works

Publications
 Frames of Reference with texts by Post Brothers and Jan Verwoert, 128 pages, 28 full colour pages, softcover with French flaps, July 2014. Broken Dimanche Press and Künstlerhaus Bethanien.

External links

Sam Smith on MUBI
 Sam Smith at Künstlerhaus Bethanien

Artists from Sydney
1980 births
Living people